Me Rex, often stylised in all capitals, is a British Indie rock band formed in London by songwriter Myles McCabe. Initially a solo endeavour it has now expanded to a full band. The current lineup is Rich Mandell (Happy Accidents), and Phoebe Cross (Happy Accidents, cheerbleederz) They have released one full-length album and multiple EPs.

History
Myles McCabe originally formed ME REX in 2015 as a solo project, though occasionally working with collaborators. Between then and 2018 he self-released six EPs each named after a dinosaur or a prehistoric mammal. ME REX toured England with anti-folk acts Crywank and Perkie in Summer 2018.

In 2019 he formed a full band with his Fresh bandmate Kathryn Woods, and their friends in Happy Accidents Rich Mandell and Phoebe Cross. This form of the band set about re-recording some of the EPs named after dinosaurs, as well as producing an entirely new full-length album entitled Megabear.

In August 2020 ME REX released the EP Triceratops digitally. In November 2022 a double EP record of both this version of Triceratops and the re-recorded version of Stegosaurus was released.

In February 2021 the band released their first full-length album Megabear. Rather than a traditional album of distinct songs; this consists of "52 short song snippets, all of them in a similar key and time signature so they can be shuffled in any order to create one continuous song with no beginning or end".

In February 2022 ME REX released EP Pterodactyl. Then, on 9 March, ME REX announced a new EP Plesiosaur would be released on 30 May 2022. This, like the first album, would be all new material.

Discography

Albums
Megabear - Big Scary Monsters, 12" LP, MP3 (2021)

Extended plays
Triceratops - Self released, MP3 (2015) / Big Scary Monsters, 12" Double EP with Stegosaurus, MP3 (2020)
Stegosaurus -  Self released, MP3 (2016) /  Big Scary Monsters, 12" Double EP with Triceratops, MP3 (2020)
Woolly Mammoth - Self released, MP3 (2016) / Rose Coloured Records, Cassette Double EP with Woolly Rhino, MP3 (2020)
Brontosaurus - Self released, MP3 (2017)
Woolly Rhino - Self released, MP3 (2017) / Rose Coloured Records, Cassette Double EP with Woolly Mammoth, MP3 (2020)
Pterodactyl - Self released, MP3 (2018) / Big Scary Monsters, MP3 (2022)
Plesiosaur - Big Scary Monsters, 12" EP, MP3 (2022)

Singles
 Flood (Split Release with Sugar Rush!) - Rose Coloured Records, Cassette, MP3 (2020)
 Galena  - Big Scary Monsters, MP3 (2021)

References

Underground punk scene in the United Kingdom
Musical groups from London
Musical groups established in 2015
English indie rock groups
2015 establishments in England
Big Scary Monsters Recording Company artists